Strata Florida was a railway station in Wales on the former Carmarthen to Aberystwyth Line serving the villages of Ystrad Meurig, Pontrhydfendigaid and Ffair-rhos.
The Manchester and Milford Railway (M&MR) opened from Pencader to Aberystwyth on 12 August 1867. The line went into receivership from 1875 to 1900.

History

The M&MR's original plan was to build a line through the mountains, one scheme involving a six-mile tunnel, to Llangurig whence it would proceed to Llanidloes, reaching Manchester over other companies' lines through Moat Lane, Newtown, Welshpool, Oswestry, Whitchurch and Crewe, however finance was not forthcoming and the prospect of such a route never being economic became apparent: only the section from Llangurig to Llanidloes was actually built. A line towards Aberystwyth via Llanilar was opened instead in 1867; from Aberystwyth access to Moat Lane and onwards could be achieved, after a reversal, by way of Machynlleth and Caersws.

The Great Western Railway took over the service in 1906, and fully absorbed the line in 1911. The Great Western Railway and the station passed on to British Railways on nationalisation in 1948.

Although proposed for closure in the Beeching Report the line closed in December 1964 due to serious damage  caused by flooding south of Aberystwyth near Llanilar Station in December 1964. The cost of repairs was deemed unjustified and led to the withdrawal of passenger services in February 1965, however milk trains continued to run from Carmarthen to nearby Pont Llanio until 1970.  Much of the route from Aberystwyth to Tregaron has now been turning into a walking and cycling trail, the Ystwyth Trail.

The station
The station was about three miles from the old abbey of Strata Florida and Lord Lisburne of Trawsgoed, an influential local landowner, had tried to have the station to be named Ystrad Meurig after the village of that name. The station was built at a point where it could serve three local villages, but its location made railway access difficult. The station itself was positioned on a tight curve, although the line from the south took a straight course across the Cors Caron bog. On leaving the station, the "branch line" towards Aberystwyth climbed out of the Teifi valley at 1:43 for about a mile to the summit of the line, before falling for four miles at 1:41 into the Ystwyth valley and Trawscoed.

The station had two platforms, basic station buildings and a signal box. All have been demolished; there are a few artefacts remaining, particularly the stationmaster's house.

Notes

References

External links 
 Photograph of a platform shelter
 Photograph of the station.

Disused railway stations in Ceredigion
Railway stations in Great Britain opened in 1866
Railway stations in Great Britain closed in 1965
Former Great Western Railway stations
1866 establishments in Wales
Beeching closures in Wales
1965 disestablishments in Wales